The Valuation Act is a 1913 United States federal law that required the Interstate Commerce Commission (ICC) to assess the value of railroad property. This information would be used to set rates for the transport of freight.

Background
The act was the brainchild of ICC commissioners Charles A. Prouty and Franklin K. Lane. Its objective was the setting of fair rates for freight shipments. It was a classic piece of Progressive Era legislation designed to find a scientific basis for setting tariffs (shipping charges) by determining the correct value of each railroad's real property and assets. Members of Congress assumed that with this information, the ICC would be able to set rates according to the principle of a reasonable rate of return on the real value of each railroad and the industry as a whole.

Implementation
The law amended the Interstate Commerce Act of 1887 and required the ICC to organize a Bureau of Valuation in order to undertake the assessments. The ICC formulated a set of procedural and reporting standards for the valuation process, and then permitted the individual railroads to complete the valuation under the nominal supervision of an ICC administration.

Although the original intent of the Valuation Act was to prepare a one-time assessment of railroad assets, subsequent legislation had the effect of prolonging the process. The Esch-Cummins Act of 1920 expanded the ICC's rate-setting responsibilities, and the agency in turn required updated valuation data from the railroads. The enlarged process led to a major increase in ICC staff, and the valuations continued for almost 20 years. The valuation process turned out to be of limited use in helping the ICC set rates fairly.

Congress passed a minor amendment to the law in 1922.

Aftermath

Prouty resigned from his Commissioner post at the ICC to serve as the first Valuation Bureau Chairman.  Lane resigned to become Secretary of the Interior in the Woodrow Wilson administration.

See also
 Hepburn Act (1906; authorized ICC to set rates)
 History of rail transport in the United States

References

Further reading

  Committee on Railroad Securities.

External links
 Selected ICC Valuation Reports (1929-1964)

1913 in American law
1913 in rail transport
62nd United States Congress
History of rail transportation in the United States
Interstate Commerce Commission
Progressive Era in the United States
United States federal transportation legislation
United States railroad regulation